The Wilcox County Courthouse Historic District is a historic district in Camden, Alabama.  It follows an irregular pattern along Broad Street, centered on the Wilcox County Courthouse.  The Wilcox County Courthouse was built in 1857 in the Greek Revival style and remains in use today. Alexander J. Bragg was the contractor. The district contains other examples of Greek Revival, Victorian, and vernacular styles of architecture.  It was added to the National Register of Historic Places on January 18, 1979.

References

External links

National Register of Historic Places in Wilcox County, Alabama
Historic districts in Wilcox County, Alabama
Greek Revival architecture in Alabama
Historic districts on the National Register of Historic Places in Alabama
Historic American Buildings Survey in Alabama
Courthouses on the National Register of Historic Places in Alabama
1857 establishments in Alabama